The Saskatoon Public Library is a publicly funded library system in Saskatoon, Saskatchewan, Canada. It is available for use by any member of the public; library cards are free for all Saskatonians. Saskatoon Public Library was established in 1913.

Branches 

Saskatoon Public Library has nine branches across Saskatoon.

Frances Morrison Library 
The Frances Morrison Central Library is located at 311 – 23rd Street East in downtown Saskatoon. It officially opened on May 28, 1966.  This facility was named after Frances Morrison, who served as SPL’s chief librarian from 1961 to 1980. The Frances Morrison Central Library is the largest of SPL’s nine libraries and houses a dedicated Children’s Department, Fine Arts Department, Local History Room, Theatre, a computer lab and various administration offices, SPL’s Outreach & Access Services, Information Services, Fiction Services and Teen Services departments.

Alice Turner Library 
The Alice Turner Branch is located at 110 Nelson Road. The current facility replaced the smaller Sutherland Branch in December 1998. It was renamed after Alice Turner McFarland who was a library employee for 37 years and chief librarian from 1981 to 1989. The first library in Canada to be built to the standards of C-2000 construction, Canada's environmental building code, Alice Turner Branch was expanded to double its original size in 2013.

Carlyle King Library 

The Carlyle King Branch is located at 3130 Laurier Drive. It officially opened October 16, 1979 and is currently located in the Cosmo Civic Centre. Carlyle King Branch was the first branch library to be part of a multi-purpose facility in Saskatoon. The branch was named in honour of Carlyle King who, in addition to a distinguished academic career, was actively involved in the Saskatchewan Library Advisory Council, the Saskatchewan Library Association and the Saskatoon Public Library Board (1955-1972).

Cliff Wright Library 
The Cliff Wright Branch is located at 1635 McKercher Drive. The Lakewood Library relocated when the Lakewood Civic Centre opened in October, 1988. The branch was officially opened on January 9, 1989, and was renamed after former mayor, Cliff Wright, on March 30, 1989.

J.S. Wood Library 
The J.S. Wood Branch is located at 1801 Landsdowne Ave. It opened in 1961 and is named after James Stuart Wood, who was born in England in 1891 and worked as a college librarian before enlisting in the British Army. He came to Canada with his family in 1925, teaching in Nipawin and Prince Albert before taking the role of Chief Librarian at SPL in 1938.

Dr. Freda Ahenakew Library 
The Dr. Freda Ahenakew Branch is located in the Monarch Yards Housing complex at the site of the Station 20 West Centre (100 – 219 Avenue K South). It was originally named the Library on 20th Street and renamed in 2017 to honour the legacy of Dr. Freda Ahenakew, in response to the Calls to Action of the Truth and Reconciliation Commission and in consultation with local Indigenous leaders.

Mayfair Library 
The Mayfair Branch is located at 602 – 33rd Street West. The original Mayfair Branch Library was established in 1952 in the basement of the Mayfair Community Hall. By 1989, the building was no longer suitable for the library and the basement location presented accessibility problems. The Mayfair Branch was reopened in 1991, on the same site, after a one-year break in service during construction.

Rusty Macdonald Library 
The Rusty Macdonald Branch is located at 225 Primrose Drive. It opened in 1989, as part of the Lawson Civic Centre, a multipurpose facility also housing a wave pool, weight room and exercise room. It is named after R. H. "Rusty" Macdonald, journalist, author, photographer and dedicated library trustee (1960-1981).

Round Prairie Library 
The Round Prairie Branch is located at 170 – 250 Hunter Road. The branch was named in honour of the La Prairie Round (or Round Prairie) Métis, who were a community of buffalo hunters that established a wintering site near Dakota Whitecap in the late 1800s. In the 1920s and 1930s many in the community were forced to migrate to Saskatoon in search of work, and by the 1940s they had established a permanent and close knit community near the current site of the new SPL branch.

Writers in Residence 
The Writer in Residence program at the library is co-funded by the Canada Council for the Arts.

Writers in Residence:

 Anne Szumigalski
 Patrick Lane
 Guy Vanderhaeghe
 Geoffrey Ursell
 Joe Rosenblatt
 Gertrude Story
 Lois Simmie
 Glen Sorestad
 Samuel Selvon
 Candace Savage
 Sean Virgo
 Armin Wiebe
 Betsey Warland
 Robert Minhinnick
 Sandra Birdsell
 Steven Ross Smith
 Harry Rintoul
 Elisabeth Harvor
 John Livingstone Clark
 Edna Alford
 Dave Margoshes
 Myrna Kostash
 Yann Martel
 J. Jill Robinson
 Jeanette Lynes
 Curtis Peeteetuce
 Yvette Nolan
 David A. Poulsen
 Dee Hobsbawn-Smith
 Arthur Slade

References

External links 
 Saskatoon Public Library
 Saskatchewan Libraries
 Saskatchewan Information and Library Services Consortium

Public libraries in Saskatchewan
Culture of Saskatoon
Library buildings completed in 1928
Tourist attractions in Saskatoon
Organizations based in Saskatoon
1913 establishments in Canada
Libraries established in 1913